Lita Milan also known as Lita Trujillo (born 1933) is an American actress. Her film credits include The Violent Men (1955), Desert Sands (1955), Gun Brothers (1956), The Ride Back (1957), Bayou (1957), The Left Handed Gun (1958), Never Love a Stranger (1958) and I Mobster (1959).

Early years
Born Iris Maria Lia Menshall in New York, Milan was a salesman's daughter.

Personal life
Milan married former president of the Dominican Republic Ramfis Trujillo in 1960. They had two sons. In 1969, Trujillo died of pneumonia, following hospitalization for a traffic accident. For years she had a sentimental relationship with the spanish bullfighter Jaime Ostos.

In a 2013 interview, Milan said of her marriage: "It was a gallant kidnapping. He (Trujillo) was a dark prince on a white horse. But at the same time it was my mistake because I could have gone much further as an actress.” She also described herself as "a sad figure. I have a tragic sense of life, although I always try to disguise it with frivolity, a way to alleviate sadness." In 2017 it was reported that Milan lives in Madrid, rarely makes public appearances, and has not appeared on television or film since 1959.

Filmography

References

External links
 

1933 births
Living people
20th-century American actresses
Jewish American actresses
People from Brooklyn
Actresses from New York City
21st-century American women